Maximilian Böttcher (20 June 1872 in Schönwalde – 16 May 1950 in Eisenach) was a German writer. He joined the Nazi Party (NSDAP) in 1937.

Works 
 Das Liebesfest des Waldfreiherrn
 Die Blankenburgs
 Die Wolfrechts
 Ewige Sehnsucht
 Krach im Hinterhaus
 Tauroggen
 ''Willst du Richter sein?"

References

Nazi Party members
1872 births
1950 deaths
German male writers